Buckthorns (Rhamnus species) are used as food plants by the larvae of a number of Lepidoptera species, including:

Monophagous
Species which feed exclusively on Rhamnus

 Bucculatricidae
 Several Bucculatrix leaf-miner species:
 B. alaternella - only on Italian buckthorn (R. alaternus)
 B. frangutella
 B. pseudosylvella - only on rock buckthorn (R. saxatilis)
 B. rhamniella
 Pieridae
 Cleopatra (Gonepteryx cleopatra)
 Powdered brimstone (G. farinosa)
 Common brimstone (G. rhamni)

Polyphagous
Species which feed on Rhamnus and other plants

 Arctiidae
Common footman (Eilema lurideola)
 Coleophoridae
Coleophora ahenella
 Geometridae
Common emerald (Hemithea aestivaria)
Engrailed (Ectropis crepuscularia)
Hebrew character (Orthosia gothica)
Scalloped oak (Crocallis elinguaria)
Winter moth (Operophtera brumata)
 Noctuidae
Common Quaker (Orthosia cerasi)
Dark dagger (Acronicta tridens)
Dun-bar (Cosmia trapezina)
 Saturniidae
Emperor moth (Pavonia pavonia)

External links 

Buckthorns
Lepidoptera